This is a list of schools in the London Borough of Hounslow, England.

State-funded schools

Primary schools

Alexandra Primary School
Beavers Community Primary School
Bedfont Primary School
Belmont Primary School
Berkeley Academy
The Blue CE Primary School
Cardinal Road Infant School
Cavendish Primary School
Chatsworth Primary School
Crane Park Primary School
Cranford Primary School
Edison Primary School
Edward Pauling Primary School
Fairholme Primary School
Feltham Hill Infant School
Green Dragon Primary School
Grove Park Primary School
Grove Road Primary School
Heston Primary School
Hounslow Heath Infant School
Hounslow Heath Junior School
Hounslow Town Primary School
Isleworth Town Primary School
Ivybridge Primary School
Lionel Primary School
Marlborough Primary School
Nishkam School West London
Norwood Green Infant School
Norwood Green Junior School
Oak Hill Academy
Orchard Primary School
Oriel Academy West London
Our Lady & St John's RC Primary School
Reach Academy Feltham
The Rosary RC Primary School
St Lawrence RC Primary School
St Mary's RC Primary School, Chiswick
St Mary's RC Primary School, Isleworth
St Michael & St Martin RC Primary School
St Paul's CE Primary School
St Richard's CE Primary School
The Smallberry Green Primary School
Southville Primary School
Sparrow Farm Primary School
Spring Grove Primary School
Springwell School
Strand-on-the-Green Infant and Nursery School
Strand-on-the-Green Junior School
Victoria Junior School
Wellington Primary School
Westbrook Primary School
The William Hogarth Primary School
Worple Primary School

Secondary schools

Bolder Academy
Brentford School for Girls	
Chiswick School	
Cranford Community College	
The Green School for Boys (Boys)
The Green School for Girls (girls)
Gumley House Convent School (girls, RC)	
Gunnersbury Boys' School (boys, RC)
The Heathland School
Heston Community School
Isleworth and Syon School (boys)
Kingsley Academy	
Lampton School
Logic Studio School
Nishkam School West London
Reach Academy Feltham	
Rivers Academy West London
St Mark's Catholic School
Space Studio West London
Springwest Academy

Special and alternative schools
The Cedars Primary School
Lindon Bennett School
Marjory Kinnon School
Oaklands School
The Rise Free School
The Woodbridge Park Education Service

Further education
West Thames College

Independent schools

Primary and preparatory schools
Ashton House School
Chiswick and Bedford Park Preparatory School
The Falcons Pre Preparatory School for Boys
Heathfield House School
Suffah Primary School
Tarbiyyah Primary School
Unique Academy

Senior and all-through schools
Arts Educational School
International School of London
Kew House
Oak Heights Independent School
The St Michael Steiner School

Special and alternative schools
Eagle Park Independent School

External links

Schools and Colleges - Hounslow Borough Council

Hounslow
Schools in the London Borough of Hounslow